Becoming a Cliché is the second solo album by British producer Adrian Sherwood. It was released on 9 October 2006 on Real World and Virgin Records.

Accolades

Track listing

Personnel 

Musicians
Richard Doswell – saxophone
Dave Fullwood – trumpet
Jazzwad – drum programming, piano (6, 7)
Chris Petter – trombone
Nick Plytas – Clavinet, organ
Filip Tavares – violin
Additional musicians
Dennis Bovell – vocals (5)
Congo Natty – drum programming (3), co-producer (3)
Doctor Pablo – melodica (12)
Samia Farah – backing vocals, vocals (6), melodica (6)
Emily Sherwood Hyman – spoken word (1)
Eric Johnson – trombone (9)
Little Roy – vocals (3)
Peter Lockett – percussion (2, 9, 13)
LSK – vocals (7, 10)

Additional musicians (cont.)
Steven "Lenky" Marsden – drum programming (12)
Skip McDonald – guitar (1, 4, 6-8, 11)
Natijah – backing vocals (3)
Carlton "Bubblers" Ogilvie – drum programming (3), bass guitar (10), piano (14)
Lee "Scratch" Perry – vocals (1)
Raiz – vocals (14)
Prithpal Rajput – percussion (5, 12)
Bim Sherman – vocals (9)
Denise Sherwood – backing vocals
Mark Stewart – vocals (11)
Technical personnel
Nick Coplowe – engineering, backing vocals, guitar (12, 13), piano (8)
Adrian Sherwood – producer

Release history

References

External links 
 

2006 albums
Adrian Sherwood albums
Albums produced by Adrian Sherwood
Real World Records albums
Virgin Records albums